Ira "Buddy" Williams (born December 17, 1952 in New York City) is an American jazz drummer.  He has played with  Grover Washington, Cedar Walton, David Sanborn, Kirk Whalum, Joe Sample, The Manhattan Transfer and others. Willams is a past member of the Saturday Night Live Band.

Discography

As sideman
With Nat Adderley
 Don't Look Back (SteepleChase, 1976)
 Hummin' (Little David, 1976)
With Andy Bey
 Experience and Judgment (Atlantic, 1974)
With Carla Bley
 Fleur Carnivore (Watt, 1989)
With Doug Carn
 Revelation (Black Jazz, 1973)
With George Freeman
 Man & Woman (Groove Merchant, 1974)
With Dizzy Gillespie
 Closer to the Source (Atlantic, 1984)
With Dave Grusin
 Dave Grusin & The GRP All-Stars - Live in Japan (Arista Records, 1981)
With Jaroslav Jakubovic
 Checkin' In (Columbia, 1978)
With Lee Ritenour
 Rio (1979)
With David Sanborn
 Straight to the Heart (Warner Bros. Records, 1984)
With Sonny Sharrock & Linda Sharrock
 Paradise (ATCO Records, 1975)
With Valerie Simpson
 Valerie Simpson (Tamla, 1972)
With Lonnie Liston Smith
 Dreams of Tomorrow (Doctor Jazz, 1983)
With Bob Stewart
 Goin' Home (JMT, 1989)
With McCoy Tyner
 Looking Out (Columbia, 1982)
With Cedar Walton
 Animation (Columbia, 1978)
 Soundscapes (Columbia, 1980)
With Hugh Masekela
 Main Event Live (A&M, 1978)
With Luther Vandross
 Never Too Much (Epic, 1981)

References

External links
 Discogs
 Official website

American jazz drummers
Living people
Saturday Night Live Band members
1952 births